During the 1979–80 English football season, Brentford competed in the Football League Third Division. Despite challenging for promotion in the first half of the season, a barren run between December 1979 and March 1980 meant that the Bees' Third Division status was only preserved on the final day of the season.

Season summary 
Brentford manager Bill Dodgin Jr. oversaw one of the quietest off-seasons in recent years, with the only change being in the striking department – Andrew McCulloch departed for a club record £60,000 fee and in came Lee Holmes and Billy Holmes, the latter for a £10,000 fee. In direct contrast to the previous two seasons, Brentford started strongly, winning six and drawing three of the first 11 league matches of the season to rise to 3rd position in the Third Division on 10 October 1979. Continued good results and a boost from the loan signing of winger Keith Fear put the Bees in 2nd place behind leaders Sheffield United one month later, but after a 7–2 victory over Hull City on 8 December (the Bees' biggest win of the season), the team's form collapsed.

Between 15 December 1979 and 29 March 1980, Brentford won just 7 of a possible 36 points and dropped from 3rd to 18th place. A 1–0 home defeat to Rotherham United at Griffin Park on 29 March left the Bees just two points above the relegation zone and the result spelt the end for manager Bill Dodgin Jr, who was given a paid leave of absence until the end of the season by the Brentford board. Former Woking manager Fred Callaghan was appointed to the position and oversaw something of a revival, though Brentford went into the final match of the season versus Millwall needing at least a point to guarantee safety. A goal from one of Bill Dodgin Jr.'s final signings, Tony Funnell, was enough to preserve Brentford's Third Division status.

One club record was equalled during the season:
 Most consecutive away Football League clean sheets: 4 (8 September – 10 October 1979)

League table

Results
Brentford's goal tally listed first.

Legend

Pre-season and friendlies

Football League Third Division

FA Cup

Football League Cup 

 Sources: 100 Years of Brentford, The Big Brentford Book of the Seventies,Croxford, Lane & Waterman, p. 315. Statto

Playing squad 
Players' ages are as of the opening day of the 1979–80 season.

 Sources: The Big Brentford Book of the Seventies, Timeless Bees

Coaching staff

Bill Dodgin Jr. (15 August 1979 – 15 March 1980)

Fred Callaghan (15 March – 3 May 1980)

Statistics

Appearances and goals
Substitute appearances in brackets.

Players listed in italics left the club mid-season.
Source: 100 Years of Brentford

Goalscorers 

Players listed in italics left the club mid-season.
Source: 100 Years of Brentford

Management

Summary

Transfers & loans

Awards 
 Supporters' Player of the Year: Pat Kruse
 Players' Player of the Year: Pat Kruse

References 

Brentford F.C. seasons
Brentford